Kenwood High School may mean:

 Kenwood Academy, a junior-senior high school opened as Kenwood High School in 1969 in Chicago, Cook County, Illinois
 Kenwood High School (Maryland), established in 1931 in Essex, Baltimore County, Maryland
 Kenwood High School (Tennessee), established in 1997 in Clarksville, Montgomery County, Tennessee

See also
 Kentwood High School (disambiguation)